Radaković (Cyrillic script: Радаковић) is a Serbian patronymic surname derived from a masculine given name Radak. It may refer to:

Branko Radaković (born 1982), actor
Michael Radaković (1866–1934), physicist
Petar Radaković (1937–1966), footballer
Borivoj Radaković (born 1951), writer
Radovan Radaković (born 1971), football goalkeeper
Uroš Radaković (born 1994), footballer

Serbian surnames
Patronymic surnames